Star Trek: Shattered Universe is a space-combat simulator video game by American studio Starsphere Interactive set in the Star Trek Mirror Universe, as portrayed in the original series episode "Mirror, Mirror". Originally intended to be one of the last Star Trek titles released by Interplay Entertainment, it sat for 2 years before being completed by TDK Mediactive; it was released for the Xbox and PlayStation 2.

The player takes control of one-man fighter spacecraft and engages in several missions.

Plot
In the game, Captain Hikaru Sulu and the crew of the USS Excelsior swap places with the crew of the mirror universe ISS Excelsior as a result of a localized stellar ion storm. They are hunted by Mirror-Chekov, who commands the ISS Enterprise, and assisted by the Klingons and Romulans. During their trek home, the Excelsior crew encounter mirror universe variations of the original series' missions, including the M5 multitronic computer (The Ultimate Computer), Balok (The Corbomite Maneuver), the giant space amoeba (The Immunity Syndrome), and the Planet Killer (The Doomsday Machine).

Time frame
While the game takes place at some point during the era of the Star Trek films, it is unclear exactly when. The Enterprise-A has not yet been decommissioned (despite the fact that the order to return to Spacedock for decommissioning was given on Stardate 9529.1-this is in the short scene in 'our' universe-and Sulu's first log was on Stardate 9585.9), but Sulu is in command of the Excelsior, placing the game somewhere in the time frame after Star Trek VI: The Undiscovered Country (Sulu does reference the events of the film in one of the cutscenes, placing the game after the film). However, in the mirror universe, Spock has not yet completed his coup d'état—the Empire contacts Mirror-Chekov several times during his mission to capture Sulu—but there is still much time for that to occur in the mirror universe timeline. Additionally, James T. Kirk is nowhere to be seen.

Reception

 

The game received "generally unfavorable reviews" on both platforms according to the review aggregation website Metacritic.

In 2009, Kotaku ranked Shattered Universe as one of the two worst Star Trek games. In 2016, Den of Geek ranked Shattered Universe as one of the five worst Star Trek games.

References

External links

 

2004 video games
Mirror Universe (Star Trek)
PlayStation 2 games
Space combat simulators
Shattered Universe
Shattered Universe
Video games developed in the United States
Xbox games
TDK Mediactive games
Single-player video games